Willie Haynes (January 25, 1901 – September 9, 1981) was an American baseball pitcher in the Negro leagues. He played with several clubs from 1920 to 1924, and with the Little Rock Grays of the Negro Southern League in 1932.

References

External links
 and Baseball-Reference Black Baseball stats and Seamheads

Baltimore Black Sox players
Harrisburg Giants players
Hilldale Club players
Indianapolis ABCs players
Little Rock Grays players
1901 births
1981 deaths
Baseball players from Texas
Baseball pitchers
20th-century African-American sportspeople